Emmerich Danzer (born 15 March 1944) is an Austrian former figure skater. He is a three-time (1966–68) World champion, a four-time (1965–68) European champion, and a four-time (1965–68) Austrian national champion.

Personal life 
Emmerich Danzer was born on 15 March 1944 in Vienna, Austria. He attended a Catholic school in Vienna.

Career

Competitive 
Emmerich Danzer began to skate at the age of five. Herta Wächter became his coach in 1953. His skating club was WEV in Vienna.

Danzer stood on his first ISU Championship podium at the 1963 Europeans in Budapest. He finished fourth the following year, in Grenoble, before winning gold ahead of France's Alain Calmat at the 1965 Europeans in Moscow. He placed fifth at the 1965 World Championships in Colorado Springs, Colorado.

Danzer was awarded gold ahead of countryman Wolfgang Schwarz at the 1966 Europeans in Bratislava and at the 1966 Worlds in Davos.

In January 1968, Danzer won his fourth consecutive continental title at the European Championships in Geneva. He was the gold medal favorite at the 1968 Winter Olympics, held in February in Grenoble, but placed fourth in the compulsory figures after almost coming to a stop. His first place in the free skate was not enough to lift him onto the podium as Schwarz took the gold. In March, Danzer was awarded his third straight World title, in Västerås.

Danzer was voted Austrian athlete of the year in 1966 and 1967.

Post-competitive 
Danzer turned professional in 1968 and performed with the Wiener Eisrevue (Vienna Ice Revue) and Holiday on Ice until 1975. He also recorded a song, Sag es mir, which became a hit in Austria. From 1975 to 1989, he worked as a coach in the United States.

Danzer began working for an insurance company in Vienna in 1989; he is in charge of sport insurance activities and sport sponsoring. From 1995 to 1997, he served as the president of the Austrian figure skating organization (Österreichischer Eiskunstlaufverband). In 2000, he became the president of the figure skating club "Wiener Eislaufverein".

Danzer is also a commentator for the Austrian television station ORF, often collaborating with Ingrid Wendl on figure skating events.

Competitive highlights

References 

 H. Prüller, Traumnote 6,0 für E. Danzer, 1968 (a book)

Navigation 

1944 births
Living people
Austrian male single skaters
Figure skaters at the 1964 Winter Olympics
Figure skaters at the 1968 Winter Olympics
Figure skaters from Vienna
Olympic figure skaters of Austria
World Figure Skating Championships medalists
European Figure Skating Championships medalists